The 1967 Chico State Wildcats football team represented Chico State College—now known as California State University, Chico—as a member of the Far Western Conference (FWC) during the 1967 NCAA College Division football season. Led by George Maderos in his tenth and final season as head coach, Chico State compiled an overall record of 2–8 with a mark of 0–6 in conference play, placing last out of seven teams in the FWC. The team was outscored by its opponents 365 to 204 for the season. The Wildcats played home games at College Field in Chico, California.

Maderos finished his tenure at Chico State with overall record of 35–59–1, for a .374 winning percentage. This the lowest winning percentage of any of the eight Chico State head coaches who spent more than two years in the position.

Schedule

References

Chico State
Chico State Wildcats football seasons
Chico State Wildcats football